John McLaughlin (January 8, 1849 – June 4, 1911) was an Ontario farmer and political figure. He represented Stormont in the Legislative Assembly of Ontario as a Conservative member from 1898 to 1902.

He was born in Cornwall Township, Canada West, the son of Felix McLaughlin, an Irish immigrant. McLaughlin was also involved in the lumber trade. He lived at Avonmore in Roxborough Township. In 1872, McLaughlin married Jennett (Janet?) Runions. He served as deputy reeve for the township from 1885 to 1886. He died in Avonmore in 1911.

External links 
 Stormont, Dundas and Glengarry : a history, 1784-1945, JG Harkness (1946)

1849 births
1911 deaths
Canadian people of Ulster-Scottish descent
People from the United Counties of Stormont, Dundas and Glengarry
Progressive Conservative Party of Ontario MPPs